Shivshankar Oraon (born 1963) is a leader of Bharatiya Janata Party from Jharkhand. He is elected to Jharkhand Legislative Assembly from Gumla. He studied MA at Ranchi University and Chinese language at School of Languages of  Jawaharlal Nehru University.

References

Living people
Jharkhand MLAs 2014–2019
Ranchi University alumni
1963 births
People from Gumla district
Bharatiya Janata Party politicians from Jharkhand